Wheeleria ivae is a moth of the family Pterophoridae that is known from former Yugoslavia, Asia Minor, Syria and Lebanon.

The larvae feed on Stachys iva.

References

Pterophorini
Moths described in 1960
Moths of the Middle East
Moths of Asia
Plume moths of Europe